Mislav Bezmalinović (born 11 May 1967) is a retired Croatian water polo player. He won an Olympic gold medal winner with Yugoslavia at the 1988 Summer Olympics.

See also
 Yugoslavia men's Olympic water polo team records and statistics
 List of Olympic champions in men's water polo
 List of Olympic medalists in water polo (men)
 List of world champions in men's water polo
 List of World Aquatics Championships medalists in water polo

External links
 

1967 births
Living people
Croatian male water polo players
Yugoslav male water polo players
Olympic water polo players of Yugoslavia
Olympic gold medalists for Yugoslavia
Water polo players from Split, Croatia
Water polo players at the 1988 Summer Olympics
Olympic medalists in water polo
Medalists at the 1988 Summer Olympics